The 1974 Clemson Tigers football team was an American football team that represented Clemson University in the Atlantic Coast Conference (ACC) during the 1974 NCAA Division I football season. In its second season under head coach Red Parker, the team compiled a 7–4 record (4–2 against conference opponents), tied for second place in the ACC, and was outscored by a total of 250 to 246. The team played its home games at Memorial Stadium in Clemson, South Carolina.

Willie Anderson, Mark Fellers, Jim Ness, and Ken Peeples were the team captains. The team's statistical leaders included quarterback Mark Fellers with 783 passing yards and 54 points scored (9 touchdowns), running back Ken Callicutt with 809 rushing yards, and Bennie Cunningham with 391 receiving yards.

Schedule

References

Clemson
Clemson Tigers football seasons
Clemson Tigers football